Mario Alberto Trejo Guzmán (born 11 February 1956) is a Mexican former professional football defender who played for Mexico in the 1986 FIFA World Cup.

References

External links
FIFA profile

1961 births
Mexican footballers
Mexico international footballers
Association football defenders
Club América footballers
Tampico Madero F.C. footballers
Liga MX players
1986 FIFA World Cup players
Living people
Mexico youth international footballers
Footballers from Mexico City